Maxime Crépeau (born May 11, 1994) is a Canadian professional soccer player who plays as a goalkeeper for Major League Soccer club Los Angeles FC and the Canadian national team. He is regarded as one of the best active goalkeepers in Major League Soccer.

Club career

Montreal Impact
Crépeau joined the Montreal Impact Academy of the Canadian Soccer League in 2010. After three seasons with the U21 squad he signed a senior contract with the Montreal Impact, becoming the team's fourth Homegrown Player on a 4-year contract. On January 5, 2015, Crépeau joined German club Fortuna Düsseldorf for a ten-day training stint before the open of Montreal's pre-season camp for the 2015 MLS season. After spending the beginning of the 2015 season with the Impact, Crépeau sat on the bench as the backup goalkeeper during the second leg of the 2015 CONCACAF Champions League Finals.

After the match, as originally planned, Crépeau was loaned to FC Montreal, the Impact's USL affiliate team, making his professional debut against the Rochester Rhinos on May 2, 2015. Crépeau would spend two seasons with FC Montreal before the club ceased operations after the 2016 season.

Prior to the 2017 season, the Impact promoted Crépeau to the #2 goalkeeper position, behind Evan Bush. In May 2017, Crépeau made his first-team debut in the first leg of the 2017 Canadian Championship against Vancouver Whitecaps FC.

Loan to Ottawa Fury
Citing a desire for more playing time in 2018, Crépeau was loaned to the Ottawa Fury of the USL for the 2018 season. After not conceding a goal in six straight games, Crépeau was named USL Player of the Month for May 2018. While playing every game for the Fury, he would consider his time with the club as a renewal, allowing him to improve on aspects of his game. By the close of the season Crépeau had set a new USL record for the most shutouts in a single season with 15, surpassing Brandon Miller who at the time was playing for the Rochester Rhinos. Crépeau would be named to the USL's All-League First Team, and would also be named USL Goalkeeper of the year. After the 2018 season, the Fury would announce that Crépeau would not return to the Fury for the 2019 season.

Vancouver Whitecaps FC
On December 9, 2018, Crépeau was traded to Vancouver Whitecaps FC in exchange for $50,000 in Targeted Allocation Money and a third-round pick in the 2020 MLS SuperDraft. He made his debut in the Whitecaps' season opener on March 2, 2019, against Minnesota United. Crepeau took over the starting goalkeeper role with the Whitecaps in 2019 and 2020, but missed a large portion of the 2020 season due to suffering a fractured thumb in the MLS is Back Tournament. In 2019 and 2021, he was named Whitecaps' player of the year. By early 2022, he had been in 63 league and cup appearances, and 14 international appearances for Canada.

Los Angeles FC
On January 20, 2022, Crépeau was traded to Los Angeles FC for $1 million in allocation money. Concerning the reasons for the move, Whitecaps CEO Axel Schuster did not give details but cited a "very special personal situation." Crepeau called the decision "personally the hardest decision I've had to make in my professional career," and noted it was not due to health of him or his family. He joined Tomas Romero and John McCarthy at LAFC as the team keepers. He made his debut for Los Angeles on February 26 in their season-opener against the Colorado Rapids, keeping a clean-sheet in a 3–0 victory. Crépeau started all but one game for LAFC in the 2022 season, but suffered a serious leg injury while drawing a red card in extra time of the 2022 MLS Cup in an attempt to defend a Philadelphia Union breakaway caused by an errant back pass, a game from which Los Angeles would emerge victorious on penalties.

International career

Youth teams
Crépeau represented Canada at the youth level, participating in the 2011 CONCACAF U-17 Championship and the subsequent FIFA U-17 World Cup later that same year. He then went on to represent Canada at the 2013 CONCACAF U-20 Championship. In August 2015 Crépeau was named to the 2015 Pan American Games roster. On September 18, 2015, he was announced as part of the 2015 CONCACAF Men's Olympic Qualifying Championship team.

In May 2016, Crepeau was called to Canada's U23 national team for a pair of friendlies against Guyana and Grenada. He started the second match against Guyana, posting a 5–1 victory.

Senior team
Crépeau received his first call up to the Canadian senior team in January 2014, as part of a training camp under coach Benito Floro. He made his debut against the United States on February 2, 2016. In June 2017 Crépeau was called up to the senior team for the 2017 CONCACAF Gold Cup. He made one appearance at the tournament, replacing an injured Milan Borjan in Canada's tournament opener against French Guiana. Crépeau was named to the squad for the 2019 CONCACAF Gold Cup in May 2019, and the 2021 CONCACAF Gold Cup in July 2021. In the 2021 Gold Cup, regular Canada starter Borjan was not called up, leaving Crépau as the first choice keeper for the tournament. He played all of Canada's matches as the team advanced all the way to the semifinals before bowing out against Mexico. It was Canada's best performance at the Gold Cup since 2007.

Crépeau was a regular call-up during the final round of qualification for the 2022 FIFA World Cup, and featured in the October 2021 window against Mexico, Jamaica and Panama. In November 2022 he suffered a broken lower leg during the MLS Cup Final, ruling him out of the World Cup squad.

Career statistics

Club

International

Honours 
Los Angeles FC
MLS Cup: 2022
Supporters' Shield: 2022

Individual
 USL Goalkeeper of the Year Award: 2018
 Whitecaps FC Player of the Year Award: 2021

References

External links

 
 
 

1994 births
Living people
Canadian soccer players
CF Montréal players
FC Montreal players
Ottawa Fury FC players
Vancouver Whitecaps FC players
Los Angeles FC players
Association football goalkeepers
Soccer people from Quebec
Major League Soccer players
USL Championship players
Canada men's youth international soccer players
Canada men's under-23 international soccer players
Canada men's international soccer players
Footballers at the 2015 Pan American Games
Montreal Impact U23 players
Canadian Soccer League (1998–present) players
2017 CONCACAF Gold Cup players
2019 CONCACAF Gold Cup players
2021 CONCACAF Gold Cup players
Sportspeople from Longueuil
Homegrown Players (MLS)
Pan American Games competitors for Canada
Celtix du Haut-Richelieu players